Semilimax semilimax is a species of air-breathing land snail, a terrestrial pulmonate gastropod mollusk in the family Vitrinidae.

Distribution 
This species occurs in:
 Czech Republic
 Ukraine

References

External links 

Vitrinidae
Gastropods described in 1802